Miyama Tameike Dam is a gravity dam located in Shimane Prefecture in Japan. The dam is used for irrigation. The catchment area of the dam is 2.5 km2. The dam impounds about 1  ha of land when full and can store 80 thousand cubic meters of water. The construction of the dam was completed in 1987.

References

Dams in Shimane Prefecture
1987 establishments in Japan